Julie Maria Barkou, also known as Julie Maria, is a Danish singer and songwriter, who has produced four long play albums to date with Beautiful Minor being her debut album in 2004.

In October 2012, Julie Maria released her fourth studio album Kom with "Ude af mig selv" and "Beat" as supporting singles.

Collaborations
She sang a duet with Danish singer Steffen Brandt "Et lykkeligt goodbye" which can be found on TV·2's album (2005).

Discography

Albums 
2004: Beautiful Minor
2007: På kanten af virkeligheden
2009: Yaguar
2012: Kom

EPs 
2008: På vej ud over kanten (Remix EP)
2011: Syv sange

References

21st-century Danish women singers
Danish songwriters
Living people
Year of birth missing (living people)